The Russian Civil War (7 November 1917 — 16 June 1923) was a multi-party civil war in the former Russian Empire sparked by the overthrowing of the monarchy and the new republican government's failure to maintain stability, as many factions vied to determine Russia's political future. It resulted in the formation of the RSFSR and later the Soviet Union in most of its territory. Its finale marked the end of the Russian Revolution, which was one of the key events of the 20th century.

The Russian monarchy had been overthrown by the 1917 February Revolution, and Russia was in a state of political flux. A tense summer culminated in the Bolshevik-led October Revolution, overthrowing the Provisional Government of the new Russian Republic. Bolshevik rule was not universally accepted, and the country descended into civil war. The two largest combatants were the Red Army, fighting for the Bolshevik form of socialism led by Vladimir Lenin, and the loosely allied forces known as the White Army, which included diverse interests favouring political monarchism, capitalism and social democracy, each with democratic and anti-democratic variants. In addition, rival militant socialists, notably the Ukrainian anarchists of the Makhnovshchina and Left Socialist-Revolutionaries, were involved in conflict against the Bolsheviks. They, as well as non-ideological green armies, opposed the Bolsheviks, the Whites and the foreign interventionists. Thirteen foreign nations intervened against the Red Army, notably the Allied intervention whose primary goal was re-establishing the Eastern Front. Three foreign nations of the Central Powers also intervened, rivaling the Allied intervention with the main goal of retaining the territory they had received in the Treaty of Brest-Litovsk.

The Bolsheviks initially consolidated control over most of the former empire. The Treaty of Brest-Litovsk was an emergency peace with the German Empire, who had captured vast swathes of the Russian Empire during the chaos of the revolution. In May 1918, the Czechoslovak Legion in Russia revolted in Siberia. In reaction, the Allies began their North Russian and Siberian interventions. That, combined with the creation of the Provisional All-Russian Government, saw the reduction of Bolshevik-controlled territory to most of European Russia and parts of Central Asia. In November, Alexander Kolchak launched a coup to take control of the Russian State, establishing a de facto military dictatorship.

In 1919, the White Army launched several attacks from the east in March, the south in July, and west in October. The advances were later checked by the Eastern Front counteroffensive, the Southern Front counteroffensive, and the defeat of the Northwestern Army. The White Movement also suffered greater losses after the Allies pulled back from northern and southern Russia. With the main base of the RSFSR secured, the Bolsheviks could now strike back, with a solid defensive position.

The armies under Kolchak were eventually forced on a mass retreat eastward. Bolshevik forces advanced east, despite encountering resistance in Chita, Yakut and Mongolia. Soon the Red Army split the Don and Volunteer armies, forcing evacuations in Novorossiysk in March and the Crimea in November 1920. After that, anti-Bolshevik resistance was sporadic for several years until the collapse of the White Army in Yakutia in June 1923, but continued on in Central Asia and Khabarovsk Krai until 1934. There were an estimated 7 to 12 million casualties during the war, mostly civilians.

Many pro-independence movements emerged after the break-up of the Russian Empire and fought in the war. Several parts of the former Russian Empire—Finland, Estonia, Latvia, Lithuania, and Poland—were established as sovereign states, with their own civil wars and wars of independence. The rest of the former Russian Empire was consolidated into the Soviet Union shortly afterwards.

Background

World War I

The Russian Empire fought in World War I from 1914 alongside France and the United Kingdom (Triple Entente) against Germany, Austria-Hungary and later the Ottoman Empire (Central Powers).

February Revolution

The February Revolution of 1917 resulted in the abdication of Nicholas II of Russia. As a result, the Russian Provisional Government was established, and soviets, elected councils of workers, soldiers, and peasants, were organized throughout the country, leading to a situation of dual power. Russia was proclaimed a republic in September of the same year.

October Revolution

The Provisional Government, led by Socialist Revolutionary Party politician Alexander Kerensky, was unable to solve the most pressing issues of the country, most importantly to end the war with the Central Powers. A failed military coup by General Lavr Kornilov in September 1917 led to a surge in support for the Bolshevik party, who gained majorities in the soviets, which until then had been controlled by the Socialist Revolutionaries. Promising an end to the war and "all power to the Soviets", the Bolsheviks then ended dual power by suppressing the Provisional Government in late October, on the eve of the Second All-Russian Congress of Soviets, in what would be the second Revolution of 1917. Despite the Bolsheviks' seizure of power, they lost to the Socialist Revolutionary Party in the 1917 Russian Constituent Assembly election, and the Constituent Assembly was dissolved by the Bolsheviks. The Bolsheviks soon lost the support of other far-left allies such as the Left Socialist-Revolutionaries after their acceptance of the terms of the Treaty of Brest-Litovsk presented by Germany.

Formation of the Red Army

From mid-1917 onwards, the Russian Army, the successor-organisation of the old Imperial Russian Army, started to disintegrate; the Bolsheviks used the volunteer-based Red Guards as their main military force, augmented by an armed military component of the Cheka (the Bolshevik state security apparatus). In January 1918, after significant Bolshevik reverses in combat, the future People's Commissar for Military and Naval Affairs, Leon Trotsky headed the reorganization of the Red Guards into a Workers' and Peasants' Red Army in order to create a more effective fighting force. The Bolsheviks appointed political commissars to each unit of the Red Army to maintain morale and to ensure loyalty.

In June 1918, when it had become apparent that a revolutionary army composed solely of workers would not suffice, Trotsky instituted mandatory conscription of the rural peasantry into the Red Army. The Bolsheviks overcame opposition of rural Russians to Red Army conscription units by taking hostages and shooting them when necessary in order to force compliance. The forced conscription drive had mixed results, successfully creating a larger army than the Whites, but with members indifferent towards Marxist–Leninist ideology.

The Red Army also utilized former Tsarist officers as "military specialists" (voenspetsy); sometimes their families were taken hostage in order to ensure their loyalty. At the start of the civil war, former Tsarist officers formed three-quarters of the Red Army officer-corps. By its end, 83% of all Red Army divisional and corps commanders were ex-Tsarist soldiers.

Anti-Bolshevik movement

While resistance to the Red Guards began on the very day after the Bolshevik uprising, the Treaty of Brest-Litovsk and the instinct of one-party rule became a catalyst for the formation of anti-Bolshevik groups both inside and outside Russia, pushing them into action against the new Soviet government.

A loose confederation of anti-Bolshevik forces aligned against the Communist government, including landowners, republicans, conservatives, middle-class citizens, reactionaries, pro-monarchists, liberals, army generals, non-Bolshevik socialists who still had grievances and democratic reformists voluntarily united only in their opposition to Bolshevik rule. Their military forces, bolstered by forced conscriptions and terror as well as foreign influence, under the leadership of General Nikolai Yudenich, Admiral Alexander Kolchak and General Anton Denikin, became known as the White movement (sometimes referred to as the "White Army") and controlled significant parts of the former Russian Empire for most of the war.

A Ukrainian nationalist movement was active in Ukraine during the war. More significant was the emergence of an anarchist political and military movement known as the Makhnovshchina, led by Nestor Makhno. The Revolutionary Insurgent Army of Ukraine, which counted numerous Jews and Ukrainian peasants in its ranks, played a key part in halting Denikin's White Army offensive towards Moscow during 1919, later ejecting White forces from Crimea.

The remoteness of the Volga Region, the Ural Region, Siberia and the Far East was favorable for the anti-Bolshevik forces, and the Whites set up a number of organizations in the cities of those regions. Some of the military forces were set up on the basis of clandestine officers organizations in the cities.

The Czechoslovak Legions had been part of the Russian Army and numbered around 30,000 troops by October 1917. They had an agreement with the new Bolshevik government to be evacuated from the Eastern Front via the port of Vladivostok to France. The transport from the Eastern Front to Vladivostok slowed down in the chaos, and the troops became dispersed all along the Trans-Siberian Railway. Under pressure from the Central Powers, Trotsky ordered the disarming and arrest of the legionaries, which created tensions with the Bolsheviks.

Allied intervention

The Western Allies armed and supported opponents of the Bolsheviks. They were worried about a possible Russo-German alliance, the prospect of the Bolsheviks making good on their threats to default on Imperial Russia's massive foreign loans and the possibility that Communist revolutionary ideas would spread (a concern shared by many Central Powers). Hence, many of the countries expressed their support for the Whites, including the provision of troops and supplies. Winston Churchill declared that Bolshevism must be "strangled in its cradle". The British and French had supported Russia during World War I on a massive scale with war materials.

After the treaty, it looked like much of that material would fall into the hands of the Germans. To meet that danger, the Allies intervened with Great Britain and France sending troops into Russian ports. There were violent clashes with the Bolsheviks. Britain intervened in support of the White forces to defeat the Bolsheviks and prevent the spread of communism across Europe.

Buffer states
The German Empire created several short-lived satellite buffer states within its sphere of influence after the Treaty of Brest-Litovsk: the United Baltic Duchy, Duchy of Courland and Semigallia, Kingdom of Lithuania, Kingdom of Poland, the Belarusian People's Republic, and the Ukrainian State. Following Germany's Armistice in World War I in November 1918, the states were abolished.

Finland was the first republic that declared its independence from Russia in December 1917 and established itself in the ensuing Finnish Civil War from January–May 1918. The Second Polish Republic, Lithuania, Latvia and Estonia formed their own armies immediately after the abolition of the Brest-Litovsk Treaty and the start of the Soviet westward offensive in November 1918.

Geography and chronology

In the European part of Russia the war was fought across three main fronts: the eastern, the southern and the northwestern. It can also be roughly split into the following periods.

The first period lasted from the Revolution until the Armistice. Already on the date of the Revolution, Cossack General Alexey Kaledin refused to recognize it and assumed full governmental authority in the Don region, where the Volunteer Army began amassing support. The signing of the Treaty of Brest-Litovsk also resulted in direct Allied intervention in Russia and the arming of military forces opposed to the Bolshevik government. There were also many German commanders who offered support against the Bolsheviks, fearing a confrontation with them was impending as well.

During the first period, the Bolsheviks took control of Central Asia out of the hands of the Provisional Government and White Army, setting up a base for the Communist Party in the Steppe and Turkestan, where nearly two million Russian settlers were located.

Most of the fighting in the first period was sporadic, involved only small groups and had a fluid and rapidly-shifting strategic situation. Among the antagonists were the Czechoslovak Legion, the Poles of the 4th and 5th Rifle Divisions and the pro-Bolshevik Red Latvian riflemen.

The second period of the war lasted from January to November 1919. At first the White armies' advances from the south (under Denikin), the east (under Kolchak) and the northwest (under Yudenich) were successful, forcing the Red Army and its allies back on all three fronts. In July 1919 the Red Army suffered another reverse after a mass defection of units in the Crimea to the anarchist Insurgent Army under Nestor Makhno, enabling anarchist forces to consolidate power in Ukraine. Leon Trotsky soon reformed the Red Army, concluding the first of two military alliances with the anarchists. In June the Red Army first checked Kolchak's advance. After a series of engagements, assisted by an Insurgent Army offensive against White supply lines, the Red Army defeated Denikin's and Yudenich's armies in October and November.

The third period of the war was the extended siege of the last White forces in the Crimea. General Wrangel had gathered the remnants of Denikin's armies, occupying much of the Crimea. An attempted invasion of southern Ukraine was rebuffed by the Insurgent Army under Makhno's command. Pursued into Crimea by Makhno's troops, Wrangel went over to the defensive in the Crimea. After an abortive move north against the Red Army, Wrangel's troops were forced south by Red Army and Insurgent Army forces; Wrangel and the remains of his army were evacuated to Constantinople in November 1920.

Warfare

October Revolution

In the October Revolution, the Bolshevik Party directed the Red Guard (armed groups of workers and Imperial army deserters) to seize control of Petrograd (Saint Petersburg) and immediately began the armed takeover of cities and villages throughout the former Russian Empire. In January 1918 the Bolsheviks dissolved the Russian Constituent Assembly and proclaimed the Soviets (workers' councils) as the new government of Russia.

Initial anti-Bolshevik uprisings

The first attempt to regain power from the Bolsheviks was made by the Kerensky-Krasnov uprising in October 1917. It was supported by the Junker Mutiny in Petrograd but was quickly put down by the Red Guard, notably including the Latvian Rifle Division.

The initial groups that fought against the Communists were local Cossack armies that had declared their loyalty to the Provisional Government. Kaledin of the Don Cossacks and General Grigory Semenov of the Siberian Cossacks were prominent among them. The leading Tsarist officers of the Imperial Russian Army also started to resist. In November, General Mikhail Alekseev, the Tsar's Chief of Staff during the First World War, began to organize the Volunteer Army in Novocherkassk. Volunteers of the small army were mostly officers of the old Russian army, military cadets and students. In December 1917, Alekseev was joined by General Lavr Kornilov, Denikin and other Tsarist officers who had escaped from the jail, where they had been imprisoned following the abortive Kornilov affair just before the Revolution. On 9 December, the Military Revolutionary Committee in Rostov rebelled, with the Bolsheviks controlling the city for five days until the Alekseev Organization supported Kaledin in recapturing the city. According to Peter Kenez, "The operation, begun on December 9, can be regarded as the beginning of the Civil War."

Having stated in the November 1917 "Declaration of Rights of Nations of Russia" that any nation under imperial Russian rule should be immediately given the power of self-determination, the Bolsheviks had begun to usurp the power of the Provisional Government in the territories of Central Asia soon after the establishment of the Turkestan Committee in Tashkent. In April 1917 the Provisional Government set up the committee, which was mostly made up of former Tsarist officials. The Bolsheviks attempted to take control of the Committee in Tashkent on 12 September 1917 but it was unsuccessful, and many leaders were arrested. However, because the Committee lacked representation of the native population and poor Russian settlers, they had to release the Bolshevik prisoners almost immediately because of a public outcry, and a successful takeover of that government body took place two months later in November. The Leagues of Mohammedam Working People (which Russian settlers and natives who had been sent to work behind the lines for the Tsarist government in 1916 formed in March 1917) had led numerous strikes in the industrial centers throughout September 1917. However, after the Bolshevik destruction of the Provisional Government in Tashkent, Muslim elites formed an autonomous government in Turkestan, commonly called the "Kokand autonomy" (or simply Kokand). The White Russians supported that government body, which lasted several months because of Bolshevik troop isolation from Moscow. In January 1918 the Soviet forces, under Lt. Col. Muravyov, invaded Ukraine and invested Kiev, where the Central Council of the Ukrainian People's Republic held power. With the help of the Kiev Arsenal Uprising, the Bolsheviks captured the city on 26 January.

Peace with the Central Powers

The Bolsheviks decided to immediately make peace with the Central Powers, as they had promised the Russian people before the Revolution. Vladimir Lenin's political enemies attributed that decision to his sponsorship by the Foreign Office of Wilhelm II, German Emperor, offered to Lenin in hope that, with a revolution, Russia would withdraw from World War I. That suspicion was bolstered by the German Foreign Ministry's sponsorship of Lenin's return to Petrograd. However, after the military fiasco of the summer offensive (June 1917) by the Russian Provisional Government had devastated the structure of the Russian Army, it became crucial that Lenin realize the promised peace. Even before the failed summer offensive the Russian population was very skeptical about the continuation of the war. Western socialists had promptly arrived from France and from the UK to convince the Russians to continue the fight, but could not change the new pacifist mood of Russia.

On 16 December 1917 an armistice was signed between Russia and the Central Powers in Brest-Litovsk and peace talks began. As a condition for peace, the proposed treaty by the Central Powers conceded huge portions of the former Russian Empire to the German Empire and the Ottoman Empire, greatly upsetting nationalists and conservatives. Leon Trotsky, representing the Bolsheviks, refused at first to sign the treaty while continuing to observe a unilateral cease-fire, following the policy of "No war, no peace".

Therefore, on 18 February 1918, the Germans began Operation Faustschlag on the Eastern Front, encountering virtually no resistance in a campaign that lasted 11 days. Signing a formal peace treaty was the only option in the eyes of the Bolsheviks because the Russian Army was demobilized, and the newly formed Red Guard could not stop the advance. They also understood that the impending counterrevolutionary resistance was more dangerous than the concessions of the treaty, which Lenin viewed as temporary in the light of aspirations for a world revolution. The Soviets acceded to a peace treaty, and the formal agreement, the Treaty of Brest-Litovsk, was ratified on 3 March. The Soviets viewed the treaty as merely a necessary and expedient means to end the war.

Ukraine, South Russia, and Caucasus (1918)

In Ukraine the German-Austrian Operation Faustschlag had by April 1918 removed the Bolsheviks from Ukraine. The German and Austro-Hungarian victories in Ukraine were caused by the apathy of the locals and the inferior fighting skills of Bolsheviks troops to their Austro-Hungarian and German counterparts.

Under Soviet pressure, the Volunteer Army embarked on the epic Ice March from Yekaterinodar to Kuban on 22 February 1918, where they joined with the Kuban Cossacks to mount an abortive assault on Yekaterinodar. The Soviets recaptured Rostov on the next day. Kornilov was killed in the fighting on 13 April, and Denikin took over command. Fighting off its pursuers without respite, the army succeeded in breaking its way through back towards the Don by May, where the Cossack uprising against the Bolsheviks had started.

The Baku Soviet Commune was established on 13 April. Germany landed its Caucasus Expedition troops in Poti on 8 June. The Ottoman Army of Islam (in coalition with Azerbaijan) drove them out of Baku on 26 July 1918. Subsequently, the Dashanaks, Right SRs and Mensheviks started negotiations with Gen. Dunsterville, the commander of the British troops in Persia. The Bolsheviks and their Left SR allies were opposed to it, but on 25 July the majority of the Soviets voted to call in the British and the Bolsheviks resigned. The Baku Soviet Commune ended its existence and was replaced by the Central Caspian Dictatorship.

In June 1918 the Volunteer Army, numbering some 9,000 men, started its Second Kuban campaign, capturing Yekaterinodar on 16 August, followed by Armavir and Stavropol. By early 1919, they controlled the Northern Caucasus.

On 8 October, Alekseev died. On 8 January 1919, Denikin became the Supreme Commander of the Armed Forces of South Russia, uniting the Volunteer Army with Pyotr Krasnov's Don Army. Pyotr Wrangel became Denikin's Chief of Staff.

In December, three-fourths of the army was in the Northern Caucasus.  That included three thousand of Vladimir Liakhov's soldiers around Vladikavkaz, thirteen thousand soldiers under Wrangel and Kazanovich in the center of the front, Stankevich's almost three thousand men with the Don Cossacks, while Vladimir May-Mayevsky's three thousand were sent to the Donets basin, and de Bode commanded two thousand in the Crimea.

Eastern Russia, Siberia and the Far East (1918)

The revolt of the Czechoslovak Legion broke out in May 1918, and proceeded to occupy the Trans-Siberian Railway from Ufa to Vladivostok.  Uprisings overthrew other Bolshevik towns. On 7 July, the western portion of the legion declared itself to be a new eastern front, anticipating allied intervention.  According to William Henry Chamberlin, "Two governments emerged as a result of the first successes of the Czechs: the  West Siberian Commissariat and the Government of the Committee of Members of the Constituent Assembly in Samara." On 17 July, shortly before the fall of Yekaterinburg, the former Tsar Nicholas II, and his family were murdered.

The Mensheviks and Socialist-Revolutionaries supported peasants fighting against Soviet control of food supplies. In May 1918, with the support of the Czechoslovak Legion, they took Samara and Saratov, establishing the Committee of Members of the Constituent Assembly—known as the "Komuch". By July the authority of the Komuch extended over much of the area controlled by the Czechoslovak Legion. The Komuch pursued an ambivalent social policy, combining democratic and socialist measures, such as the institution of an eight-hour working day, with "restorative" actions, such as returning both factories and land to their former owners. After the fall of Kazan, Vladimir Lenin called for the dispatch of Petrograd workers to the Kazan Front: "We must send down the maximum number of Petrograd workers: (1) a few dozen 'leaders' like Kayurov; (2) a few thousand militants 'from the ranks'".

After a series of reverses at the front, the Bolsheviks' War Commissar, Trotsky, instituted increasingly harsh measures in order to prevent unauthorised withdrawals, desertions, and mutinies in the Red Army. In the field, the Cheka Special Investigations Forces (termed the Special Punitive Department of the All-Russian Extraordinary Commission for Combat of Counter-Revolution and Sabotage or Special Punitive Brigades) followed the Red Army, conducting field tribunals and summary executions of soldiers and officers who deserted, retreated from their positions, or failed to display sufficient offensive zeal. The Cheka Special Investigations Forces were also charged with the detection of sabotage and counter-revolutionary activity by Red Army soldiers and commanders. Trotsky extended the use of the death penalty to the occasional political commissar whose detachment retreated or broke in the face of the enemy. In August, frustrated at continued reports of Red Army troops breaking under fire, Trotsky authorised the formation of barrier troops – stationed behind unreliable Red Army units and given orders to shoot anyone withdrawing from the battle line without authorisation.

In September 1918, the Komuch, the Siberian Provisional Government, and other anti-Bolshevik Russians agreed during the State Meeting in Ufa to form a new Provisional All-Russian Government in Omsk, headed by a Directory of five: two Socialist-Revolutionaries. Nikolai Avksentiev and Vladimir Zenzinov, the Kadet lawyer V. A. Vinogradov, Siberian Premier Vologodskii, and General Vasily Boldyrev.

By the fall of 1918 anti-Bolshevik White forces in the east included the People's Army (Komuch), the Siberian Army (of the Siberian Provisional Government) and insurgent Cossack units of Orenburg, the Urals, Siberia, Semirechye, Baikal, and Amur and Ussuri Cossacks, nominally under the orders of Gen. V.G. Boldyrev, Commander-in-Chief, appointed by the Ufa Directorate.

On the Volga, Col. Kappel's White detachment captured Kazan on 7 August, but Red Forces recaptured the city on 8 September 1918 following a counteroffensive. On the 11th Simbirsk fell, and on 8 October Samara. The Whites fell back eastwards to Ufa and Orenburg.

In Omsk the Russian Provisional Government quickly came under the influence and later the dominance of its new War Minister, Rear-Admiral Kolchak. On 18 November a coup d'état established Kolchak as dictator. Two members of the Directory were arrested, and subsequently deported, while Kolchak was proclaimed "Supreme Ruler", and "Commander-in-Chief of all Land and Naval Forces of Russia." By mid-December 1918 the White armies had to leave Ufa, but they balanced that failure with a successful drive towards Perm, which they took on 24 December.

Central Asia (1918)

In February 1918 the Red Army overthrew the White Russian-supported Kokand Autonomy of Turkestan. Although that move seemed to solidify Bolshevik power in Central Asia, more troubles soon arose for the Red Army as the Allied Forces began to intervene. British support of the White Army provided the greatest threat to the Red Army in Central Asia during 1918. Britain sent three prominent military leaders to the area. One was Lieutenant Colonel Frederick Marshman Baile, who recorded a mission to Tashkent, from where the Bolsheviks forced him to flee. Another was General Wilfrid Malleson, leading the Malleson Mission, who assisted the Mensheviks in Ashkhabad (now the capital of Turkmenistan) with a small Anglo-Indian force. However, he failed to gain control of Tashkent, Bukhara and Khiva. The third was Major General Dunsterville, who was driven out by the Bolsheviks of Central Asia only a month after his arrival in August 1918. Despite setbacks as a result of British invasions during 1918, the Bolsheviks continued to make progress in bringing the Central Asian population under their influence. The first regional congress of the Russian Communist Party convened in the city of Tashkent in June 1918 in order to build support for a local Bolshevik Party.

Left SR Uprising

On 6 July 1918, two Left Socialist-Revolutionaries and Cheka employees, Yakov Blumkin and Nikolai Andreyev, assassinated the German ambassador, Count Mirbach. In Moscow a Left SR uprising was put down by the Bolsheviks, mass arrests of Socialist-Revolutionaries followed, and executions became more frequent. Chamberlin noted, "The time of relative leniency toward former fellow-revolutionists was over. The Left Socialist Revolutionaries, of course, were no longer tolerated as members of the Soviets; from this time the Soviet regime became a pure and undiluted dictatorship of the Communist Party."  Similarly, Boris Savinkov's surprise attacks were suppressed, with many of the conspirators being executed, as "Mass Red Terror" became a reality.

Estonia, Latvia and Petrograd

Estonia cleared its territory of the Red Army by January 1919. Baltic German volunteers captured Riga from the Red Latvian Riflemen on 22 May, but the Estonian 3rd Division defeated the Baltic Germans a month later, aiding the establishment of the Republic of Latvia.

That rendered possible another threat to the Red Army, from General Yudenich, who had spent the summer organizing the Northwestern Army in Estonia with local and British support. In October 1919, he tried to capture Petrograd in a sudden assault with a force of around 20,000 men. The attack was well-executed, using night attacks and lightning cavalry maneuvers to turn the flanks of the defending Red Army. Yudenich also had six British tanks, which caused panic whenever they appeared. The Allies gave large quantities of aid to Yudenich, but he complained of receiving insufficient support.

By 19 October, Yudenich's troops had reached the outskirts of the city. Some members of the Bolshevik central committee in Moscow were willing to give up Petrograd, but Trotsky refused to accept the loss of the city and personally organized its defenses. Trotsky himself declared, "It is impossible for a little army of 15,000 ex-officers to master a working-class capital of 700,000 inhabitants." He settled on a strategy of urban defense, proclaiming that the city would "defend itself on its own ground" and that the White Army would be lost in a labyrinth of fortified streets and there "meet its grave".

Trotsky armed all available workers, men and women, and ordered the transfer of military forces from Moscow. Within a few weeks, the Red Army defending Petrograd had tripled in size and outnumbered Yudenich three to one. Yudenich, short of supplies, then decided to call off the siege of the city and withdrew. He repeatedly asked permission to withdraw his army across the border to Estonia. However, units retreating across the border were disarmed and interned by orders of the Estonian government, which had entered into peace negotiations with the Soviet Government on 16 September and had been informed by the Soviet authorities of their 6 November decision that if the White Army was allowed to retreat into Estonia, it would be pursued across the border by the Reds. In fact, the Reds attacked Estonian army positions and fighting continued until a ceasefire went into effect on 3 January 1920. After the Treaty of Tartu. most of Yudenich's soldiers went into exile. Former Imperial Russian and then Finnish General Mannerheim planned an intervention to help the Whites in Russia capture Petrograd. However, he did not gain the necessary support for the endeavour. Lenin considered it "completely certain, that the slightest aid from Finland would have determined the fate of [the city]".

Northern Russia (1919)

The British occupied Murmansk and, alongside the Americans, seized Arkhangelsk. With the retreat of Kolchak in Siberia, they pulled their troops out of the cities before the winter trapped them in the port. The remaining White forces under Yevgeny Miller evacuated the region in February 1920.

Siberia (1919)
At the beginning of March 1919, the general offensive of the Whites on the eastern front began. Ufa was retaken on 13 March; by mid-April, the White Army stopped at the Glazov–Chistopol–Bugulma–Buguruslan–Sharlyk line. Reds started their counteroffensive against Kolchak's forces at the end of April. The Red 5th Army, led by the capable commander Tukhachevsky, captured Elabuga on 26 May, Sarapul on 2 June and Izevsk on the 7th and continued to push forward. Both sides had victories and losses, but by the middle of summer the Red Army was larger than the White Army and had managed to recapture territory previously lost.

Following the abortive offensive at Chelyabinsk, the White armies withdrew beyond the Tobol. In September 1919 a White offensive was launched against the Tobol Front, the last attempt to change the course of events. However, on 14 October the Reds counterattacked, and thus began the uninterrupted retreat of the Whites to the east. On 14 November 1919 the Red Army captured Omsk. Adm. Kolchak lost control of his government shortly after the defeat; White Army forces in Siberia had essentially ceased to exist by December. Retreat of the eastern front by White armies lasted three months, until mid-February 1920, when the survivors, after crossing Lake Baikal, reached the Chita area and joined Ataman Semenov's forces.

South Russia (1919)

The Cossacks had been unable to organise and capitalise on their successes at the end of 1918. By 1919 they had begun to run short of supplies. Consequently, when the Soviet counteroffensive began in January 1919 under the Bolshevik leader Antonov-Ovseenko, the Cossack forces rapidly fell apart. The Red Army captured Kiev on 3 February 1919.

Denikin's military strength continued to grow in 1919, with significant munitions supplied by the British. In January, Denikin's Armed Forces of South Russia (AFSR) completed the elimination of Red forces in the northern Caucasus and moved north, in an effort to protect the Don district.

On 18 December 1918, French forces landed in Odessa and then the Crimea, but evacuated Odessa on 6 April 1919, and the Crimea by the end of the month.  According to Chamberlin, "But France gave far less practical aid to the Whites than did England; its sole independent venture in intervention, at Odessa, ended in a complete fiasco." 

Denikin then reorganized the Armed Forces of South Russia under the leadership of Vladimir May-Mayevsky, Vladimir Sidorin, and Pyotr Wrangel. On 22 May, Wrangel's Caucasian army defeated the 10th Army (RSFSR) in the battle for Velikoknyazheskaya, and then captured Tsaritsyn on 1 July. Sidorin advanced north toward Voronezh, increasing his army's strength in the process. On 25 June, May-Mayevsky captured Kharkov, and then Ekaterinoslav on 30 June, which forced the Reds to abandon Crimea. On 3 July, Denikin issued his Moscow directive, in which his armies would converge on Moscow.

Although Britain had withdrawn its own troops from the theatre, it continued to give significant military aid (money, weapons, food, ammunition and some military advisers) to the White Armies during 1919. Major Ewen Cameron Bruce of the British Army had volunteered to command a British tank mission assisting the White Army. He was awarded the Distinguished Service Order for his bravery during the June 1919 Battle of Tsaritsyn for single-handedly storming and capturing the fortified city of Tsaritsyn, under heavy shell fire in a single tank, which led to the capture of over 40,000 prisoners. The fall of Tsaritsyn is viewed "as one of the key battles of the Russian Civil War" and greatly helped the White Russian cause. The notable historian Sir Basil Henry Liddell Hart comments that Bruce's tank action during the battle is to be seen as "one of the most remarkable feats in the whole history of the Tank Corps".

On 14 August, the Bolsheviks launched their Southern Front counteroffensive. After six weeks of heavy fighting the counteroffensive failed, and Denikin was able to capture more territory. By November, White Forces had reached the Zbruch, the Ukrainian-Polish border.

Denikin's forces constituted a real threat and for a time threatened to reach Moscow. The Red Army, stretched thin by fighting on all fronts, was forced out of Kiev on 30 August. Kursk and Orel were taken, on 20 September and 14 October, respectively. The latter, only  from Moscow, was the closest the AFSR would come to its target. The Cossack Don Army under the command of General Vladimir Sidorin continued north towards Voronezh, but Semyon Budyonny's cavalrymen defeated them there on 24 October. That allowed the Red Army to cross the Don River, threatening to split the Don and Volunteer Armies. Fierce fighting took place at the key rail junction of Kastornoye, which was taken on 15 November. Kursk was retaken two days later.

Kenez states, "In October Denikin ruled more than forty million people and controlled the economically most valuable parts of the Russian Empire." Yet, "The White armies, which had fought victoriously during the summer and early fall, fell back in disorder in November and December." Denikin's front line was overstretched, while his reserves dealt with Makhno's anarchists in the rear. Between September and October, the Reds mobilized one hundred thousand new soldiers and adopted the Trotsky-Vatsetis strategy with the Ninth and Tenth armies forming V. I. Shorin's Southeastern Front between Tsaritsyn and Bobrov, while the Eighth, Twelfth, Thirteenth, and Fourteenth armies formed A.I. Egorov's Southern Front between Zhitomir and Bobrov. Sergey Kamenev was in overall command of the two fronts. On Denikin's left was Abram Dragomirov, while in his center was Vladimir May-Mayevsky's Volunteer Army, Vladimir Sidorin's Don Cossacks were further east, with Pyotr Wrangel's Caucasian army at Tsaritsyn, and an additional was in the Northern Caucasus attempting to capture Astrakhan. On 20 October, May-Mayevsky was forced to evacuate Orel during the Orel-Kursk operation. On 24 October, Semyon Budyonny captured Voronezh, and Kursk on 15 November, during the Voronezh-Kastornoye operation (1919). On 6 January, the Reds reached the Black Sea at Mariupol and Taganrog, and On 9 January, they reached Rostov. According to Kenez, "The Whites had now lost all the territories which they had conquered in 1919, and held approximately the same area in which they had started two years before."

Central Asia (1919)
By February 1919 the British government had pulled its military forces out of Central Asia. Despite the success for the Red Army, the White Army's assaults in European Russia and other areas broke communication between Moscow and Tashkent. For a time Central Asia was completely cut off from Red Army forces in Siberia. Although the communication failure weakened the Red Army, the Bolsheviks continued their efforts to gain support for the Bolshevik Party in Central Asia by holding a second regional conference in March. During the conference, a regional bureau of Muslim organisations of the Russian Bolshevik Party was formed. The Bolshevik Party continued to try to gain support among the native population by giving it the impression of better representation for the Central Asian population and throughout the end of the year could maintain harmony with the Central Asian people.

Communication difficulties with Red Army forces in Siberia and European Russia ceased to be a problem by mid-November 1919. Red Army successes north of Central Asia caused communication with Moscow to be re-established and the Bolsheviks to claim victory over the White Army in Turkestan.

In the Ural-Guryev operation of 1919–1920, the Red Turkestan Front defeated the Ural Army. During winter 1920, Ural Cossacks and their families, totaling about 15,000 people, headed south along the eastern coast of the Caspian Sea towards Fort Alexandrovsk. Only a few hundred of them reached Persia in June 1920. The Orenburg Independent Army was formed from Orenburg Cossacks and others troops who rebelled against the Bolsheviks. During the winter 1919–20, the Orenburg Army retreated to Semirechye in what is known as the Starving March, as half of the participants perished. In March 1920 her remnants crossed the border into the Northwestern region of China.

South Russia, Ukraine and Kronstadt (1920–21)

At the beginning of 1920, Denikin was reduced to defending Novorossia, the Crimean peninsula, and the Northern Caucasus. On 26 January, the Caucasian army retreated beyond the Manych. On 7 February, the Reds occupied Odessa, but then Makhno started fighting the Fourteenth Red Army. On 20 February, Denikin succeeded in recapturing Rostov, his last victory, before giving it up soon after.

By the beginning of 1920, the main body of the Armed Forces of South Russia was rapidly retreating towards the Don, to Rostov. Denikin hoped to hold the crossings of the Don, then rest and reform his troops, but the White Army was not able to hold the Don area, and at the end of February 1920 started a retreat across Kuban towards Novorossiysk. Slipshod evacuation of Novorossiysk proved to be a dark event for the White Army. Russian and Allied ships evacuated about 40,000 of Denikin's men from Novorossiysk to the Crimea, without horses or any heavy equipment, while about 20,000 men were left behind and either dispersed or were captured by the Red Army. Following the disastrous Novorossiysk evacuation, Denikin stepped down and the military council elected Wrangel as the new Commander-in-Chief of the White Army. He was able to restore order to the dispirited troops and reshape an army that could fight as a regular force again. It remained an organized force in the Crimea throughout 1920.

After Moscow's Bolshevik government signed a military and political alliance with Nestor Makhno and the Ukrainian anarchists, the Insurgent Army attacked and defeated several regiments of Wrangel's troops in southern Ukraine, forcing him to retreat before he could capture that year's grain harvest.

Stymied in his efforts to consolidate his hold, Wrangel then attacked north in an attempt to take advantage of recent Red Army defeats at the close of the Polish–Soviet War of 1919–1920. The Red Army eventually halted the offensive, and Wrangel's troops had to retreat to Crimea in November 1920, pursued by both the Red and Black cavalry and infantry. Wrangel's fleet evacuated him and his army to Constantinople on 14 November 1920, ending the struggle of Reds and Whites in Southern Russia.

After the defeat of Wrangel, the Red Army immediately repudiated its 1920 treaty of alliance with Nestor Makhno and attacked the anarchist Insurgent Army; the campaign to liquidate Makhno and the Ukrainian anarchists began with an attempted assassination of Makhno by Cheka agents. Anger at continued repression by the Bolshevik Communist government and at its liberal use of the Cheka to put down anarchist elements led to a naval mutiny at Kronstadt in March 1921, followed by peasant revolts. Red Army attacks on the anarchist forces and their sympathisers increased in ferocity throughout 1921.

Siberia and the Far East (1920–22)

In Siberia, Admiral Kolchak's army had disintegrated. He himself gave up command after the loss of Omsk and designated Gen. Grigory Semyonov as the new leader of the White Army in Siberia. Not long afterward, Kolchak was arrested by the disaffected Czechoslovak Legion as he traveled towards Irkutsk without the protection of the army and was turned over to the socialist Political Centre in Irkutsk. Six days later, the regime was replaced by a Bolshevik-dominated Military-Revolutionary Committee. On 6–7 February Kolchak and his prime minister Victor Pepelyaev were shot and their bodies were thrown through the ice of the frozen Angara River, just before the arrival of the White Army in the area.

Remnants of Kolchak's army reached Transbaikalia and joined Semyonov's troops, forming the Far Eastern army. With the support of the Japanese army it was able to hold Chita, but after the withdrawal of Japanese soldiers from Transbaikalia, Semenov's position became untenable, and in November 1920 he was driven by the Red Army from Transbaikalia and took refuge in China. The Japanese, who had plans to annex the Amur Krai, finally pulled their troops out as Bolshevik forces gradually asserted control over the Russian Far East. On 25 October 1922 Vladivostok fell to the Red Army, and the Provisional Priamur Government was extinguished.

Aftermath

Ensuing rebellion
In Central Asia, Red Army troops continued to face resistance into 1923, where basmachi (armed bands of Islamic guerrillas) had formed to fight the Bolshevik takeover. The Soviets engaged non-Russian peoples in Central Asia, like Magaza Masanchi, commander of the Dungan Cavalry Regiment, to fight against the Basmachis. The Communist Party did not completely dismantle the group until 1934.

General Anatoly Pepelyayev continued armed resistance in the Ayano-Maysky District until June 1923. The regions of Kamchatka and Northern Sakhalin remained under Japanese occupation until their treaty with the Soviet Union in 1925, when their forces were finally withdrawn.

Casualties

The results of the civil war were momentous. Soviet demographer Boris Urlanis estimated the total number of men killed in action in the Civil War and Polish–Soviet War as 300,000 (125,000 in the Red Army, 175,500 White armies and Poles) and the total number of military personnel dead from disease (on both sides) as 450,000. Boris Sennikov estimated the total losses among the population of Tambov region in 1920 to 1922 resulting from the war, executions, and imprisonment in concentration camps as approximately 240,000.

As many as 10 million lives were lost as a result of the Russian Civil War, and the overwhelming majority of these were civilian casualties. During the Red Terror, estimates of Cheka executions range from 12,733 to 1.7 million. William Henry Chamberlin suspected that there were about 50,000. Evan Mawdsley suspected that there were more than 12,733, and less than 200,000. Some sources claimed at least 250,000 summary executions of "enemies of the people" with estimates reaching above a million. More modest estimates put the numbers executed by the Bolsheviks between December 1917 and February 1922 at around 28,000 per year, with roughly 10,000 executions during the Red Terror.

Some 300,000–500,000 Cossacks were killed or deported during Decossackization, out of a population of around three million. An estimated 100,000 Jews were killed in Ukraine. Punitive organs of the All Great Don Cossack Host sentenced 25,000 people to death between May 1918 and January 1919. Kolchak's government shot 25,000 people in Ekaterinburg province alone. The White Terror, as it would become known, killed about 300,000 people in total.

At the end of the Civil War the Russian SFSR was exhausted and near ruin. The droughts of 1920 and 1921, as well as the 1921 famine, worsened the disaster still further, killing roughly 5 million people. Disease had reached pandemic proportions, with 3,000,000 dying of typhus throughout the war. Millions more also died of widespread starvation, wholesale massacres by both sides and pogroms against Jews in Ukraine and southern Russia. By 1922 there were at least 7,000,000 street children in Russia as a result of nearly ten years of devastation from World War I and the civil war.

Another one to two million people, known as the White émigrés, fled Russia, many with General Wrangel, some through the Far East and others west into the newly independent Baltic countries. The émigrés included a large percentage of the educated and skilled population of Russia.

The Russian economy was devastated by the war, with factories and bridges destroyed, cattle and raw materials pillaged, mines flooded and machines damaged. The industrial production value descended to one seventh of the value of 1913 and agriculture to one third. According to Pravda, "The workers of the towns and some of the villages choke in the throes of hunger. The railways barely crawl. The houses are crumbling. The towns are full of refuse. Epidemics spread and death strikes—industry is ruined." It is estimated that the total output of mines and factories in 1921 had fallen to 20% of the pre-World War level, and many crucial items experienced an even more drastic decline. For example, cotton production fell to 5%, and iron to 2%, of pre-war levels.

War communism saved the Soviet government during the Civil War, but much of the Russian economy had ground to a standstill. Some peasants responded to requisitions by refusing to till the land. By 1921 cultivated land had shrunk to 62% of the pre-war area, and the harvest yield was only about 37% of normal. The number of horses declined from 35 million in 1916 to 24 million in 1920 and cattle from 58 to 37 million. The exchange rate with the US dollar declined from two roubles in 1914 to 1,200 Rbls in 1920.

With the end of the war, the Communist Party no longer faced an acute military threat to its existence and power. However, the perceived threat of another intervention, combined with the failure of socialist revolutions in other countries—most notably the German Revolution—contributed to the continued militarisation of Soviet society. Although Russia experienced extremely rapid economic growth in the 1930s, the combined effect of World War I and the Civil War left a lasting scar on Russian society and had permanent effects on the development of the Soviet Union.

In fiction

Literature
 The Road to Calvary (1922–41) by Aleksey Nikolayevich Tolstoy
 Chapaev (1923) by Dmitri Furmanov
 The Iron Flood (1924) by Alexander Serafimovich
 Red Cavalry (1926) by Isaac Babel
 The Rout (1927) by Alexander Fadeyev
 Conquered City (1932) by Victor Serge
 Futility (1922) by William Gerhardie
 How the Steel Was Tempered (1934) by Nikolai Ostrovsky
 Optimistic Tragedy (1934) by Vsevolod Vishnevsky
 And Quiet Flows the Don (1928–1940) by Mikhail Sholokhov
 The Don Flows Home to the Sea (1940) by Mikhail Sholokhov
 Doctor Zhivago (1957) by Boris Pasternak
 The White Guard (1966) by Mikhail Bulgakov
 Byzantium Endures (1981) by Michael Moorcock
 Chevengur (written in 1927, first published in 1988 in the USSR) by Andrei Platonov.
 Fall of Giants (2010) by Ken Follett
 A Splendid Little War (2012) by Derek Robinson (novelist)

Film
 Arsenal (1928)
 Storm Over Asia (1928)
 Chapaev (1934)
 Thirteen (1936), directed by Mikhail Romm
 We Are from Kronstadt (1936), directed by Yefim Dzigan
 Knight Without Armour (1937)
 The Year 1919 (1938), directed by Ilya Trauberg
 The Baltic Marines (1939), directed by A. Faintsimmer
 Shchors (1939), directed by Dovzhenko
 Pavel Korchagin (1956), directed by A. Alov and V. Naumov
 The Forty-First (1956), directed by Grigori Chukhrai
 The Communist (film) (1957), directed by Yuli Raizman
 And Quiet Flows the Don (1958), directed by Sergei Gerasimov
 Doctor Zhivago (1965), directed by David Lean
 The Elusive Avengers (1966)
 The Red and the White (1967)
 White Sun of the Desert (1970)
 The Flight (1970), directed by A. Alov and V. Naumov
 Reds (1981), directed by Warren Beatty
 Corto Maltese in Siberia (2002)
 Nine Lives of Nestor Makhno (2005/2007)
 Admiral (2008)
 Sunstroke (2014), directed by Nikita Mikhalkov

See also

 Polish–Soviet War (1917-1922)
 Bibliography of the Russian Revolution and Civil War
 Index of articles related to the Russian Revolution and Civil War
 Nikolayevsk incident
 Revolutionary Mass Festivals
 Timeline of the Russian Civil War
 Allied Powers intervention in the Russian Civil War

Notes

References

Citations

Bibliography

 
 
 
 
 
 
 
 
 
 
 
 Grebenkin, I.N. "The Disintegration of the Russian Army in 1917: Factors and Actors in the Process." Russian Studies in History 56.3 (2017): 172–187.

Further reading

 Acton, Edward, V. et al. eds. Critical companion to the Russian Revolution, 1914–1921 (Indiana UP, 1997).
 Brovkin, Vladimir N. (1994). Behind the Front Lines of the Civil War: Political Parties and Social Movements in Russia, 1918–1922. Princeton UP. excerpt 
 Dupuy, T. N. The Encyclopedia of Military History (many editions) Harper & Row Publishers.
 Ford, Chris. "Reconsidering the Ukrainian Revolution 1917–1921: The Dialectics of National Liberation and Social Emancipation." Debatte 15.3 (2007): 279–306.
 Peter Kenez. Civil War in South Russia, 1918: The First Year of the Volunteer Army (U of California Press, 1971).
 Lincoln, W. Bruce. Red victory: A history of the Russian Civil War (1989).
 Luckett, Richard. The White Generals: An Account of the White Movement and the Russian Civil War (Routledge, 2017).
 Marples, David R. Lenin's Revolution: Russia, 1917–1921 (Routledge, 2014).
 Moffat, Ian, ed. The Allied Intervention in Russia, 1918–1920: The Diplomacy of Chaos (2015)
 Polyakov, Yuri. The Civil War in Russia: Its Causes and Significance (Novosti, 1981).
 Serge, Victor. Year One of the Russian Revolution (Haymarket, 2015).
 Smele, Jonathan D. If Grandma had Whiskers...': Could the Anti-Bolsheviks have won the Russian Revolutions and Civil Wars? Or, the Constraints and Conceits of Counterfactual History." Revolutionary Russia (2020): 1–32. . 
 Smele, Jonathan. The 'Russian' Civil Wars, 1916–1926: Ten Years That Shook the World (Oxford UP, 2016).
 Smele, Jonathan D. Historical Dictionary of the Russian Civil Wars, 1916–1926 (2 Vol. Rowman & Littlefield, 2015).
 Stewart, George. The White Armies of Russia: A Chronicle of Counter-Revolution and Allied Intervention (2008) excerpt 
 Stone, David R. "The Russian Civil War, 1917–1921," in The Military History of the Soviet Union.
 Swain, Geoffrey (2015). The Origins of the Russian Civil War excerpt 
 Smele, Jonathan D. "Still Searching for the 'Third Way': Geoffrey Swain's Interventions in the Russian Civil Wars". Europe-Asia Studies 68.10 (2016): 1793–1812.

Primary sources
 Butt, V. P., et al., eds. The Russian Civil War: Documents from the Soviet Archives (Springer, 2016).
 McCauley, Martin, ed. The Russian Revolution and the Soviet State 1917–1921: Documents (Springer, 1980).
 Murphy, A. Brian, ed. The Russian Civil War: Primary Sources (Springer, 2000) online review

External links

Newsreels about Russian Civil War // Net-Film Newsreels and Documentary Films Archive
Sumpf, Alexandre: Russian Civil War, in: 1914–1918 online. International Encyclopedia of the First World War.
 Mawdsley, Evan: International Responses to the Russian Civil War (Russian Empire), in: 1914–1918 online. International Encyclopedia of the First World War.
 Read, Christopher: Revolutions (Russian Empire), in: 1914–1918 online. International Encyclopedia of the First World War.
 Peeling, Siobhan: War Communism, in: 1914–1918 online. International Encyclopedia of the First World War.
 Beyrau, Dietrich: Post-war Societies (Russian Empire), in: 1914–1918 online. International Encyclopedia of the First World War.
 Brudek, Pawe³: Revolutions (East Central Europe), in: 1914–1918 online. International Encyclopedia of the First World War.
 Melancon, Michael S.: Social Conflict and Control, Protest and Repression (Russian Empire), in: 1914–1918 online. International Encyclopedia of the First World War.
 Russian Revolution and Civil War archive at libcom.org/library
 "BBC History of the Russian Revolution" (3 February 2007)
 "Russian Civil War" (Spartacus History, downloaded 3 January 2006)
 "Russian Civil War 1918–1920" (On War website, downloaded 4 January 2006)
 "Civil War of 1917–1922 at Encyclopedia of Russian History (3 February 2007)

 
1910s in Russia
1920s in Russia
1920s in the Soviet Union
Civil wars involving the states and peoples of Europe
Civil wars of the Industrial era
Revolution-based civil wars
Civil War
Wars involving Chechnya
Wars involving Russia
Wars involving the Soviet Union
1910s conflicts
1920s conflicts
Communism-based civil wars
Wars involving Ukraine